Municipal elections were held in Rome on 28–29 May 2006 to elect the Mayor of Rome and 60 members of the City Council, as well as the nineteen presidents and more than 400 councillors of the 19 municipi in which the municipality was divided.

The two main candidates were the incumbent left-wing Walter Veltroni and the national-conservative Minister of Agricolture Gianni Alemanno.

As a result, the incumbent mayor Walter Veltroni was re-elected for a second five-year term by a landslide.

Background
In April 2006 national general election saw a narrow victory for the centre-left coalition led by Romano Prodi over the incumbent Prime Minister Silvio Berlusconi, leader of the centre-right coalition House of Freedoms. To prevent a possible political advantage for the centre-left coalition, Berlusconi had previously fixed the date of the general election in early April, avoiding the municipal elections (which interested Rome and many other big cities such as Milan, Naples and Turin) to take place on the same day, as it actually happened in 2001. Berlusconi stated this was due to his fear that good government by centre-left mayors could favour the centre-left coalition in the general election. The date for municipal elections was ultimately fixed by the Government for 28–29 May 2006.

Mayoral election
The incumbent mayor Walter Veltroni, whose popularity had hugely increased during his term in office, was then widely considered one of the most popular left-wing politicians in Italy. His candidacy was supported by the new centre-left platform, called The Union. His main opponent was the incumbent Minister of Agricolture Gianni Alemanno, supported by the centre-right House of Freedoms alliance.

During the campaign Alemanno was heavily criticized for the support, sought and obtained at the national level by Berlusconi, of a number of fascist movements and parties, notably the Social Alternative of Alessandra Mussolini, granddaughter of the former dictator of Italy. Alemanno himself sparked public outrage after appearing live with a celtic cross on his neck during a TV show just a week before the election.

Voting system
The voting system is used for all mayoral elections in Italy, in the city with a population higher than 15,000 inhabitants.  Under this system voters express a direct choice for the mayor or an indirect choice voting for the party of the candidate's coalition. If no candidate receives 50% of votes, the top two candidates go to a second round after two weeks. This gives a result whereby the winning candidate may be able to claim majority support, although it is not guaranteed.

The election of the City Council is based on a direct choice for the candidate with a preference vote: the candidate with the majority of the preferences is elected. The number of the seats for each party is determined proportionally.

Parties and candidates
This is a list of the major parties (and their respective leaders) which participated in the election.

Results

Municipi election

All the presidents of each municipio were elected on the first round. Table below shows the results for each municipio with the percentage for each coalition:

Source: Municipality of Rome - Electoral Service

References

2006 elections in Italy
Rome
Rome
Elections in Rome
2000s in Rome
May 2006 events in Europe